The Press is a daily newspaper published in Christchurch, New Zealand owned by media business Stuff Ltd. First published in 1861, the newspaper is the largest circulating daily in the South Island and publishes Monday to Saturday. One community newspaper—Northern Outlook- is also published by The Press and is free.

The newspaper has won the title of New Zealand Newspaper of the Year (in its circulation category) three times: in 2006, 2007 and 2012. It has also won the overall Newspaper of the Year title twice: in 2006 and 2007.

History 

James FitzGerald came to Lyttelton on the Charlotte Jane in December 1850, and was from January 1851 the first editor of the Lyttelton Times, Canterbury's first newspaper. From 1853, he focussed on politics and withdrew from the Lyttelton Times. After several years in England, he returned to Canterbury concerned about the proposed capital works programme of the provincial government, with his chief concern the proposed rail tunnel connecting Christchurch and Lyttelton, which he thought of as fiscally irresponsible, but supported by his old newspaper, the Lyttelton Times. The newspaper's editor, Crosbie Ward, made an imputation of unknown content, and this spurred FitzGerald to set up The Press as a rival newspaper.

FitzGerald had dinner with John Watts-Russell, who put up £500 on the condition that FitzGerald would be in charge of the new newspaper. Next, he enlisted the support of the Rev. John Raven, who organised many of the practical aspects, like organising a printer and a printing press. Other members of the early committee that organised The Press were Henry Porcher Lance (brother of James Dupré Lance), Henry Tancred, and Richard J. S. Harman; all of them were colonial gentry.

The Press was first published on 25 May 1861 from a small cottage, making it the oldest surviving newspaper in the South Island of New Zealand.  The cottage belonged to Raven on land known as Raven's paddock on the west side of Montreal Street, between Worcester and Gloucester Streets, opposite the present-day Christchurch Art Gallery.  The first edition was a six-page tabloid and was sold for sixpence. The paper continued as a weekly. The public saw FitzGerald as the proprietor of The Press, but the newspaper saw reason to publicly state that "it is not a fact that Mr FitzGerald has either pecuniary or official connexion" with it; he was however the driving force behind the paper.

On 13 June 1863, the first part of Samuel Butler's Erewhon appeared in The Press in an article signed with the pseudonym Cellarius (q.v.) and headed "Darwin among the Machines."

In 1905, The Press purchased a block of the Cathedral Square site for £4,000.  The Board then purchased the right of way (Press Lane) and what was going to be the original Theatre Royal site from the Theatre Royal Syndicate for £5000.  The Gothic part of the Press building (occupied by the company until 22 February 2011) was built starting in 1907 and the Press staff shifted into it in February 1909 from their Cashel Street premises.

In the 1930s, The Press began to seek solutions to the slow delivery times of the newspaper to the West Coast.  Roads at the time were difficult, and the New Zealand Railways Department was unwilling to reschedule any of its ordinary passenger trains to operate at the early morning times desired by The Press as patronage would have been uneconomic, and freight trains did not provide a desirable measure of swiftness.  Accordingly, The Press was willing to subsidise the construction and operation of two small Leyland diesel railbuses to carry the newspapers by rail at a desirable time.  These little railbuses began service on 3 August 1936 and left Christchurch at 2:20 am, travelling down the Midland Line to reach Greymouth at 6:40 am and then continue along the Ross Branch as far as Hokitika, arriving just before 8:00 am.  This provided substantially quicker delivery of the newspaper than was previously possible.  However, these railbuses were intended to only be a temporary measure and they were replaced by the much larger Vulcan railcars as soon as they arrived in New Zealand in the early 1940s.

In 1995, The Press was the country's first news outlet that established a website for news. In 2000, Independent Newspapers Ltd (INL) launched its news website branded as Stuff and from then on, The Press and Stuff worked on online content collaboratively.

In February 2011, The Press main building in central Christchurch was badly damaged in the 2011 Christchurch earthquake. All production was operated from their printing plant near Christchurch Airport until June 2012, when the central Christchurch building was partially rebuilt and upgraded. It was one of the first buildings in the Christchurch CBD to be rebuilt and operational.

The paper format for the weekday editions changed from broadsheet to compact in 2018, with only the Saturday edition retaining the larger format.

Motto 
The motto on the masthead – "Nihil utile quod non-honestum" translates to "Nothing is useful that is not honest." Like The Age in Australia, the newspaper's masthead features the Royal Arms.

Ownership
The early ownership, beyond the newspaper having been financed by Watts-Russell, is unclear. In February 1862, an attempt was made to form a company and formalise the ownership of the paper. A deed of association for "The Proprietors of The Press" was drafted, and it lists the five members of the previous committee (Watts-Russell, Raven, Lance, Tancred, and Harman), plus five new members: Alfred Richard Creyke, John Hall, Joseph Brittan, Isaac Cookson, and James Somerville Turnbull. Surprisingly, the deed was not executed, but four-month later, FitzGerald, who had no funds, was the sole owner "through the liberality of the proprietors", as he called it later. FitzGerald lost control of the newspaper ownership in 1868 and the Press Company was incorporated as the owner. That company was dissolved in 1890 and George Stead bought the assets. Stead established the Christchurch Press Company and became its chairman.

The Christchurch Press Company was sold to Independent Newspapers Ltd in 1987, and INL in turn was bought by Fairfax New Zealand in 2003. The Australian parent company, Fairfax Media, merged with Nine Entertainment Co. in December 2018.

Editors
The following have been editors of The Press:

Awards and nominations

Awards and nominations for journalists employed by The Press

Notes

References

External links

The Press at Papers Past (archive from 1861 to 1979)

Newspapers published in New Zealand
Newspapers established in 1861
Stuff (company)
Mass media in Christchurch
History of Christchurch
1861 establishments in New Zealand